My Wife Is a Gangster is a 2001 South Korean film directed by Jo Jin-kyu; it's about a female gang boss who must wed to fulfill her dying sister's wishes. A sequel, My Wife Is a Gangster 2, was released in 2003, with a third (My Wife Is a Gangster 3) released at the end of 2006. The film became a box office success.

Plot
Eun-jin was separated from her older sister Yu-jin when they were kids at an orphanage. While growing up, Eun-jin became a Kkangpae (Korean Mafia) gangster and adopted the nickname "Mantis". Upon discovering that Yu-jin had cancer, Eun-jin demanded that the doctors perform an operation, but they refused. The dying Yu-jin wished that her sister would marry soon, so Eun-jin went on a blind date under the advice of her underling Romeo, who invited a stylist to design the appropriate makeup for Eun-jin. However, the date was a disaster and Romeo was sent to find someone else more suitable.

Later, while Eun-jin was smashing up a car in retaliation against two men, a man ran up to protect her, but was accidentally hit in the head by Eun-jin. The man, Kang Soo-il, was simple, but kind-hearted. He seemed perfect for Eun-jin and he later married her. Yu-jin spoke to Eun-jin about her desire to have children and Eun-jin set out to get pregnant. She forced her husband into several occasions of sexual intercourse.

While Eun-jin was out for a meal with her group, she was approached by a man from a rival gang, the White Sharks. He was asked to leave after he had a drink from Eun-Jin, but still lingered. Annoyed, she stabbed him in the head, barely missing his eyes. The next day, there was a meeting between Eun-jin and the White Sharks and a showdown was arranged between Eun-jin and Nanman.

Eun-jin and Nanman fought fiercely. It seemed that Nanman had the upper hand after stabbing Eun-jin in the stomach. However, as he went to finish her off, she moved out the way and Nanman fell down a cliff. Nanman managed to climb back up and tries to strangle Eun-jin. Eun-jin found a way to escape and stomps on Nanman's groin after she stabs the ground right next to his face, refusing to kill him.

Soo-il eventually found out that Eun-jin was a gangster after seeing her tattoo on her back, and wanted her to give it up. Eun-jin discovered she was pregnant and told Yu-jin. Later, Yu-jin then died in front of Eun-jin after telling Eun-jin that her baby deserves a father.

Later, Romeo died in the arms of Sherry, after being stabbed by five street punks. Sherry uses the public telephone to call Andy that Romeo has been stabbed. Andy mistakenly believed it was Nanman and the White Sharks who killed Romeo and set out to take revenge on them. Upon arriving at the White Sharks' warehouse, Andy and the rest of his group discovered that they were heavily outnumbered. The pregnant Eun-jin went out to fight the gangsters, but suffered a miscarriage after suffering a vicious attack by Nanman. Eun-jin told Nanman to stop kicking her in the belly as she was pregnant. Nanman then revealed that he had become a eunuch after his earlier showdown with Eun-jin.

As Nanman was about to stab Eun-jin, her boss turns up and pleads to the White Shark to spare her life in exchange for some documents. Soo-il found out that Eun-jin was pregnant when she was in the hospital. He takes revenge on White Shark by dousing the gang and him with kerosene. As he was holding up the lighter, Soo-il was restrained but White Shark foolishly ignites himself, along with 64 other men, when attempting to light his cigarette. The film ends with Soo-il as the leader alongside Eun-jin, who is starting a showdown with another gang leader.

Title
The title, 조폭 마누라, is pronounced Jopok Manura. 조폭 (jopok) is a Sino-Korean word: 組暴. The first character, 組, is pronounced "jo" in Korean, and refers to a group, gang, or organization. The second character, 暴, is pronounced "Pok" (or sometimes Po) in Korean, and refers to violence and cruelty. The word itself,  조폭, connotes organized crime such as the Mafia, as opposed to random thuggery, and this explains some of the references to "professionalism" in the film.

The second word of the title, 마누라, is pronounced manura. This word means wife, but with a distinctly disrespectful connotation. There are at least two other words in Korean, 아내 (a-nay) and 집사람 (jipsaram), that can be used by a man to refer to his own wife in a deferential but respectful way. By contrast, 마누라, has an insulting edge. An approximate translation in American English would be "the old Lady", but without any affection implied.

The complete title, Jopok Manura, thus epitomizes the central paradox of the film. It is probably best translated as "Gangster Wife". The heroine, Eun-jin, is a respected professional (jopok) in the world of organized crime, but a loathsome hag (manura) in the world of traditional Korean gender relations.

The paradox is resolved when Soo-il takes vengeance on his wife's enemies by dousing them with kerosene. When he ultimately appears as his wife's second in the film's final showdown, the conflict between their social roles is resolved. At the end, both are outlaws in terms of legal acceptability, but they have become a legitimate married couple in the context of their referential peer group, the gangster underworld.

Cast 
 Shin Eun-kyung as Cha Eun-jin
 Park Sang-myun as Kang Su-il
 Lee Eung-kyung as Yu-jin
 Kim In-kwon as Banse
 Ahn Jae-mo as Bada
 Jang Se-jin as Baek sang-eo
 Choi Min-soo
 Eun-ju Choi
 Kim In-mun as Oden Food
 Yeon Jung-hoon as Hyo-min
 Gye-nam Myeong as Boss
 Shin Shin-ae as Marriage Centre Consultant

Reception
It was the fourth highest-grossing film for the year in Korea with 1.46 million admissions. It grossed $26.4 million worldwide.

External links
 
 
 
 My Wife Is a Gangster Cine21

References

2001 films
2000s Korean-language films
Films about organized crime in South Korea
Films directed by Jo Jin-kyu
South Korean crime comedy films
South Korean gangster films
South Korean films remade in other languages
2000s crime comedy films
2000s South Korean films